Bells of Christmas

Bells of Christmas, album by BZN 1989
"Bells of Christmas", The Beach Boys M.I.U. Album